The 1976 Women's Olympic Volleyball Tournament was the 4th edition of the event, organized by the world's governing body, the FIVB in conjunction with the IOC. It was held in Montréal, Québec, Canada from July 19 to 30, 1976.

This is the second time the Japanese Women's National Volleyball Team won in the Olympics. The team was coached by Shigeo Yamada.

Qualification

* South Korea and Hungary qualified as next best team as Japan and Soviet Union are already qualified.
** East Germany qualified after a special tournament held in Heidelberg, West Germany.

Format
The tournament was played in two different stages. A single round-robin format was played within each pool to determine the teams position in the pool. The  (second stage) was played in a single elimination format, where the preliminary round two highest ranked teams in each group advanced to the semifinals and the two lowest ranked teams advanced to the 5th–8th place semifinals.

Pools composition

Rosters

Venues
 Montréal Forum, Québec, Canada
 Paul Sauvé Arena, Québec, Canada

Preliminary round
 venue: Paul Sauvé Arena.

Group A

|}

|}

Group B

|}

|}

Final round

5th–8th place
 venue: Paul Sauvé Arena.

5th–8th place semifinals

|}

7th place match

|}

5th place match

|}

Final
 venue: Montréal Forum.

Semifinals

|}

Bronze medal match

|}

Gold medal match

|}

Final standing

Medalists

References

External links
 Volleyball
 Final standings (1964-2000) at FIVB.org
 Official results (pgs. 596-609)

O
1976
1976 in women's volleyball
Women's volleyball in Canada
Vol